James Graham (January 7, 1793 – September 25, 1851) was a North Carolina attorney and politician. He served as Congressional Representative from that state.

Personal life 
He was the older brother of North Carolinian senator William Alexander Graham. James Graham graduated from the University of North Carolina at Chapel Hill in 1814 in classical studies. Graham studied law and was admitted to the bar in 1818 and commenced practice in Rutherford County, North Carolina.

Career 
He was a member of the State House of Representatives in 1822, 1823, 1824, 1828, and 1829.

Graham was then elected as a National Republican to the twenty-third Congress (March 4, 1833 – March 3, 1835). Graham served from March 4, 1835, to March 29, 1836. He was subsequently elected as a National Republican to the same Congress, re-elected as a Whig to the Twenty-fifth, Twenty-sixth, and Twenty-seventh Congresses serving from December 5, 1836, to March 3, 1843. He was the chairman of the Committee on Public Expenditures (Twenty-seventh Congress).

He was an unsuccessful candidate for reelection in 1842 to the Twenty-eighth Congress; elected as a Whig to the Twenty-ninth Congress (March 4, 1845 – March 3, 1847) but did not run again in 1846.

After his political career, Graham farmed near Rutherfordton, North Carolina, where he died September 25, 1851.

See also
Twenty-third United States Congress
Twenty-fourth United States Congress
Twenty-fifth United States Congress
Twenty-sixth United States Congress
Twenty-seventh United States Congress
Twenty-ninth United States Congress

External links 
 

1793 births
1851 deaths
People from Lincoln County, North Carolina
American people of Scotch-Irish descent
North Carolina Whigs
University of North Carolina at Chapel Hill alumni
Members of the North Carolina House of Representatives
National Republican Party members of the United States House of Representatives from North Carolina
Whig Party members of the United States House of Representatives
19th-century American politicians
People from Rutherfordton, North Carolina
Members of the United States House of Representatives removed by contest